Amos Nathan Tversky (March 16, 1937 – June 2, 1996) was an Israeli cognitive and mathematical psychologist and a key figure in the discovery of systematic human cognitive bias and handling of risk.

Much of his early work concerned the foundations of measurement.  He was co-author of a three-volume treatise, Foundations of Measurement.  His early work with Daniel Kahneman focused on the psychology of prediction and probability judgment; later they worked together to develop prospect theory, which aims to explain irrational human economic choices and is considered one of the seminal works of behavioral economics.

Six years after Tversky's death, Kahneman received the 2002 Nobel Memorial Prize in Economic Sciences for the work he did in collaboration with Amos Tversky. (The prize is not awarded posthumously.)  Kahneman told The New York Times in an interview soon after receiving the honor:  "I feel it is a joint prize.  We were twinned for more than a decade."

Tversky also collaborated with many leading researchers including Thomas Gilovich, Itamar Simonson, Paul Slovic and Richard Thaler. A Review of General Psychology survey, published in 2002, ranked Tversky as the 93rd most cited psychologist of the 20th century, tied with Edwin Boring, John Dewey, and Wilhelm Wundt.

Early life and education
Tversky was born in Haifa, British Palestine (now Israel), as son of the Polish-born veterinarian Yosef Tversky and Lithuanian Jewish Jenia Tversky (née Ginzburg), a social worker who later became a member of the Knesset representing  the Mapai (Workers' Party). Tversky had one sister, Ruth, thirteen years his senior.

Tversky's mother has said he was self-taught in many areas, including mathematics. In high school, Tversky took classes from literary critic Baruch Kurzweil, and befriended classmate Dahlia Ravikovich, who would become an award-winning poet.

Tversky received his bachelor's degree from Hebrew University of Jerusalem in Israel in 1961, and his doctorate from the University of Michigan in Ann Arbor in 1965. He had already developed a clear vision of researching judgement.

Military service and career
During this time he was also a member and leader in Nahal, an Israel Defense Forces program that combined compulsory military service with the establishment of agricultural settlements.

Tversky served with distinction in the Israel Defense Forces as a paratrooper, rising to the rank of captain and being decorated for bravery.  He parachuted in combat zones during the Suez Crisis in 1956, commanded an infantry unit during the Six-Day War in 1967, and served in a psychology field-unit during the Yom Kippur War in 1973.

Academic career

Academic roles

After his doctorate, Tversky taught at Hebrew University. He then joined the faculty of Stanford University in 1978, where he spent the rest of his career.

Academic work

Work with Daniel Kahneman
Amos Tversky's most influential work was done with his longtime collaborator, Daniel Kahneman, in a partnership that began in the late 1960s.  Their work explored the biases and failures in rationality continually exhibited in human decision-making.  Starting with their first paper together, "Belief in the Law of Small Numbers", Kahneman and Tversky laid out eleven "cognitive illusions" that affect human judgment, frequently using small-scale empirical experiments that demonstrate how subjects make irrational decisions under uncertain conditions.  (They introduced the notion of cognitive bias in 1972.) This work was highly influential in the field of economics, which had largely presumed rationality of all actors.

According to Kahneman the collaboration 'tapered off' in the early 1980s, although they tried to revive it. Factors included Tversky receiving most of the external credit for the output of the partnership, and a reduction in the generosity with which Tversky and Kahneman interacted with each other.

Comparative ignorance
Tversky and Fox (1995) addressed ambiguity aversion, the idea that people do not like ambiguous gambles or choices with ambiguity, with the comparative ignorance framework. Their idea was that people are only ambiguity averse when their attention is specifically brought to the ambiguity by comparing an ambiguous option to an unambiguous option. For instance, people are willing to bet more on choosing a correct colored ball from an urn containing equal proportions of black and red balls than an urn with unknown proportions of balls when evaluating both of these urns at the same time. However, when evaluating them separately, people are willing to bet approximately the same amount on either urn. Thus, when it is possible to compare the ambiguous gamble to an unambiguous gamble people are averse — but not when one is ignorant of this comparison.

Notable contributions

 foundations of measurement
 anchoring and adjustment
 availability heuristic
 base rate fallacy
 conjunction fallacy
 framing
 behavioral finance
 clustering illusion
 loss aversion
 prospect theory
 cumulative prospect theory
 representativeness heuristic
 Tversky index
 support theory
 contrast model
 feature matching account of similarity

Approach to research

Kahneman said that Tversky "had simply perfect taste in choosing problems, and he never wasted much time on anything that was not destined to matter. He also had an unfailing compass that always kept him going forward.

Tversky's 1974 Science article with Kahneman on cognitive illusions triggered a "cascade of related research," Science News wrote in a 1994 article tracing the recent history of research on reasoning. Decision theorists in economics, business, philosophy and medicine as well as psychologists cited their work.

Recognition

In 1980 he became a fellow of the American Academy of Arts and Sciences.

In 1984 he was a recipient of the MacArthur Fellowship, and in 1985 he was elected to the National Academy of Sciences.   Tversky, as a co-recipient with Daniel Kahneman, earned the 2003 University of Louisville Grawemeyer Award for Psychology.

After Tversky's death, Kahneman was awarded the 2002 Nobel Memorial Prize in Economic Sciences for the work he did in collaboration with Tversky. Nobel prizes are not awarded posthumously.

Personality and characteristics

Kahneman has said "Amos was the freest person I have known, and he was able to be free because he was also one of the most disciplined."

Persi Diaconis, a professor of mathematics at Stanford, has said "You were happy being in his presence. There was a light shining out of him."

Gerhard Casper, President of Stanford University, said Tversky "maintained the highest standards of professional ethics", and "His dedication to Stanford and its institutions of faculty governance was exemplary."

Whilst being very collaborative, Tversky also had a lifelong habit of working alone at night while others slept.

In intellectual debate Tversky "wanted to crush the opposition".

Tversky believed that humans live under uncertainty, in a probabilistic universe.

Personal life
In 1963 Tversky married American psychologist Barbara Gans, who later became a professor in the human-development department at Teachers College, Columbia University.  They had three children together.

He died of a metastatic melanoma in 1996.

He was a Jewish atheist.

In popular culture

Tversky intelligence test

As recounted by Malcolm Gladwell in 2013's David and Goliath: Underdogs, Misfits, and the Art of Battling Giants, Tversky's peers thought so highly of him that they devised a tongue-in-cheek one-part test for measuring intelligence. As related to Gladwell by psychologist Adam Alter, the Tversky intelligence test was "The faster you realized Tversky was smarter than you, the smarter you were."

The Undoing Project

Michael Lewis's book The Undoing Project: A Friendship That Changed Our Minds, released in 2016, is about Tversky's personal and professional relationship with Daniel Kahneman.

References

External links
 
 Memorial Resolution - Amos Tversky
 Boston Globe: The man who wasn't there
 Daniel Kahneman – Autobiography
 Tversky in group discussion (39 mins) https://www.youtube.com/watch?v=BoiFo3MA0mc
 Tversky lecturing; https://www.youtube.com/watch?v=zO0oLX_WEYQ

1937 births
1996 deaths
20th-century Israeli economists
20th-century American psychologists
Jewish American atheists
Behavioral economists
Behavioral finance
American cognitive psychologists
Experimental economists
Fellows of the American Academy of Arts and Sciences
Fellows of the Econometric Society
MacArthur Fellows
Foreign associates of the National Academy of Sciences
Academic staff of the Hebrew University of Jerusalem
Stanford University Department of Psychology faculty
University of Michigan alumni
Israeli atheists
Israeli emigrants to the United States
Israeli psychologists
20th-century Israeli Jews
Jewish American scientists
Framing theorists
Israeli people of Belarusian-Jewish descent
Financial economists
People from Haifa
Deaths from melanoma